AQN may refer to:

 AQN (airline), a defunct Australian airline
 AQN (company), a Canadian power company